Alexander Maitland may refer to:

 Alexander Maitland (Scottish politician), Baron of the Court of Exchequer in Scotland and Member of Parliament
 Alexander Maitland (Michigan politician), Lieutenant Governor of Michigan
 Sir Alexander Maitland, 1st Baronet, general in the British Army